Minett Islet is a small islet in Jamestown Bay, Sitka Sound in Alaska. It is named for United States Navy officer and Governor of American Samoa Henry Minett.

References

Islands of Alaska
Islands of Sitka, Alaska